Shahad is a town in the Thane district in Maharashtra state in India. It is located 60 km from Mumbai. Shahad's Pin code is 421103 and postal head office is Shahad.

References

Cities and towns in Thane district